Adi Lagamu Lewaturaga Vuiyasawa is a Fijian businesswoman and former politician.  On 4 November 2005, she was appointed to the Senate to complete the unexpired term of her de facto husband, Ratu Inoke Takiveikata, who forfeited his seat owing to his imprisonment on charges related to his role in an army mutiny that followed the Fiji coup of 2000.  Vuiyasawa became one of 9 nominees of Prime Minister in the 32-member Senate; another 8 are chosen by the Leader of the Opposition, 1 by the Council of Rotuma, and 14 by the Great Council of Chiefs.  Her appointment was made retrospective to 20 October. Her career in the Senate came to an end with the military coup of 5 December 2006.

Education and career 
Vuiyasawa was educated at Saint Anne's Primary School and St Joseph's Secondary School, Fiji, and Kay International College of Hairdressing in Auckland, New Zealand.  She subsequently set up her own hairdressing business and served on the Naitasiri Provincial Council.  At the time of her appointment to the Senate, she was also President of the Naitasiri branch of the Soqosoqo Vakamarama, a women's organization.

Personal life 
Vuiyasawa hails from Nairukuruku Village in Naitasiri Province. She is the daughter of the late Ratu Alipate Baledrokadroka, himself a former Senator and Chief of northern Naitasiri, who held the title of Turaga Taukei ni Waluvu.  Her mother, Adi Silafaga Kamikamica, came from the tokatoka Nacokula, Lasakau village, on Bau Island.  Vuiyasawa was previously married to the late Ratu Ilaitia Vuiyasawa, with whom she had five children and two grandchildren.  Her brother, Jone Baledrokadroka, was a senior army officer, who was dismissed on 13 January 2006 for alleged insubordination.

Vuiyasawa's relationship to Takiveikata became known to the public only after her appointment to the Senate, and Opposition parliamentarian Poseci Bune declared her appointment in such circumstances to be unethical, a position rejected by Prime Minister Qarase.  Vuiyasawa herself defended her appointment on 5 December, saying that it was based not on her relationship to Takiveikata, but on her own ties with Naitasiri Province as the President of the Naitasiri Soqosoqo Vaka Marama.  Her relationship to Takiveikata was irrelevant, she considered.  "We are individuals," she said.  She also denied being Takiveikata's de facto wife, distinguishing that term from "partner," the term she used. Adi Lagamu and Ratu Inoke were legally married after Ratu Inoke was released from Prison in 2007.

References

I-Taukei Fijian members of the Senate (Fiji)
Year of birth missing (living people)
Living people
Soqosoqo Duavata ni Lewenivanua politicians
I-Taukei Fijian people
Politicians from Naitasiri Province